The 1943–44 season was Chelsea Football Club's fifth season of wartime football during the Second World War. As the Football League and the FA Cup were suspended for the duration, the club instead competed in regional competitions. Records and statistics for these matches are considered unofficial. Due to the disruption of the war, the club often fielded guest players from other clubs. Chelsea finished 8th in the 18-team Football League South. They also reached the final of the Southern Football League Cup, losing to Charlton Athletic at Wembley.

Notes

References

External links
 Chelsea in the Second World War at chelseafc.com

1943–44
English football clubs 1943–44 season